Kennedy Creek Natural Area Preserve is a state-protected Natural Area near US Highway 101 on Oyster Bay, Puget Sound, in southwest Washington state, United States.  The preserve is on the border of Thurston County and Mason County and contains  of intertidal salt marsh and upland forest.

The Area is located approximately 100 yards from the junction of U.S. Highway 101 and Old Olympic Highway, about a 15-minute drive from Washington's capital city of Olympia.  Parking areas are located on the side of Old Olympic Highway, and a short all-weather pedestrian trail leads to an improved wildlife viewing and interpretive area.  The Preserve is visited by large numbers of migratory waterfowl, especially in winter months.  Birding is best on a falling tide.

Kennedy Creek, whose headwaters are  Summit Lake in the Black Hills, is one of the largest Chum salmon spawning areas in the lower Puget Sound, and has a genetically distinct run of Chum salmon. A forest trail about  up from Oyster Bay along Kennedy Creek was opened in 2000 for salmon viewing during spawning season.

A $1 million expansion of the area has been proposed and is pending legislative action.

References

External links

Kennedy Creek salmon trail at South Puget Sound Salmon Enhancement Group

Protected areas of Thurston County, Washington
Protected areas of Mason County, Washington
Washington Natural Areas Program